The New York State Inebriate Asylum, later known as Binghamton State Hospital, was the first institution designed and constructed to treat alcoholism as a mental disorder in the United States. Located in Binghamton, NY, its imposing Gothic Revival exterior was designed by New York architect Isaac G. Perry and construction was completed in 1864.  The building was declared a National Historic Landmark in 1997.  In 2015, Binghamton University announced it had taken stewardship of the building and will proceed with plans for rehabilitation of the building.

Description and history
The former New York State Inebriate Asylum building is located high on a prominent hilltop in eastern Binghamton, at 425 Robinson Street.  It is a large and imposing Gothic Revival stone building, built according to the principles of the Kirkbride Plan for large institutions.  When built it was T-shaped, with a central core designed to house administrative functions, wings projecting to the sides for housing patients, and service functions in a wing projecting behind the administrative core.  The service wing has since been demolished.

The asylum was chartered in 1854, but site work and construction on this campus did not begin until 1857, in what were then the rural outskirts of Binghamton.  The asylum admitted its first patients in 1864, but the building was not completed for another two years.  It was the first large-scale public facility in which alcoholism was treated as a medical condition.  It served this function until 1879, when it was converted to a mental hospital.  The facilities were significantly enlarged in the 1880s, with the addition of many buildings that have since been demolished.  The building remained in use as a mental hospital or psychiatric services center until 1993, when it was closed due to inadequate maintenance.

In 2008, SUNY Upstate Medical University took over the vacant building, with plans rehabilitate the main building and to establish a satellite campus on the grounds.  Due to a general economic downturn, the university never developed the building beyond stabilizing its condition.  In 2015, Binghamton University announced it had taken stewardship of the building and published plans for rehabilitation of the building.

References

External links 

2013 interior and exterior photos
Castle on the Hill, commercial photography website
 4 data pages on New York State Inebriate Asylum, at Historic American Buildings Survey
American Insane Asylums. American Psychosurgery.

Hospital buildings completed in 1864
Psychiatric hospitals in New York (state)
Buildings and structures in Broome County, New York
History of Broome County, New York
National Register of Historic Places in Broome County, New York
National Historic Landmarks in New York (state)
State University of New York Upstate Medical University